The 1994 Winter Olympics figure skating competition was held at the Hamar Olympic Amphitheatre.

Qualifying
As the host country, Norway automatically qualified spots to the 1994 Olympics. In 1992, however, the Norwegian Olympic Committee announced that skaters aspiring to be selected for Norway would have to finish in the top 12 at the European or World Championships. Since none met this requirement, Norway decided to have no competitors in figure skating at the Olympics. Although Leslie Monod / Cédric Monod's result at the 1993 World Championships allowed Switzerland to send two pairs to the Olympics, the Swiss Olympic Association elected not to send a pair after the Monods finished 11th at the 1994 European Championships.

Medal summary

Medal table

Events

Participating NOCs
Twenty eight nations sent figure skaters to compete in the events.

In film
Tonya Harding's and Nancy Kerrigan's participation in the competition is part of the story of the 2017 American film I, Tonya.

References

External links
 Official Olympic report
 results
 Baiul Wins Gold; Kerrigan Takes Silver : Olympics: Figure skating events wind up--in more controversy. Los Angeles Times. Retrieved January 10, 2022.
 '94 WINTER OLYMPICS / LILLEHAMMER : Baiul Wins on a Split Decision : Now Kerrigan Should Be Asking, 'Why Me?' Los Angeles Times. Retrieved January 10, 2022.
 https://www.nytimes.com/1994/02/27/sports/winter-olympics-the-judges-judge-says-baiul-deserves-the-gold.html

 
1994 Winter Olympics events
1994
1994 in figure skating
International figure skating competitions hosted by Norway